Hemidactylus achaemenidicus is a species of gecko. It is endemic to Iran.

References

Hemidactylus
Reptiles described in 2019
Reptiles of Iran
Endemic fauna of Iran
Taxa named by Farhang Torki